Most of Connecticut's rivers flow into Long Island Sound and from there the waters mix into the Atlantic Ocean. A few extremely eastern rivers flow into Block Island Sound. The list is arranged by drainage basin from east to west, with respective tributaries indented from downstream to upstream under each larger stream's name.

By drainage basin (east to west)

Block Island Sound  

Pawcatuck River – easternmost CT river basin 
Shunock River
Ashaway River (Rhode Island)
Green Fall River
Wood River

Long Island Sound 

 Mystic River
 Whitford Brook
Poquonock River
Thames River
Oxoboxo River
Shetucket River
Quinebaug River
Pachaug River
Blackwell Brook
Moosup River
Five Mile River
Little River (Quinebaug River tributary)
French River
Little River (Shetucket River tributary)
Merrick Brook
Beaver Brook
Natchaug River
Mount Hope River
Fenton River
Bigelow Brook
Still River (Natchaug River tributary)
Willimantic River
Tenmile River
Hop River
Skungamaug River
Yantic River
Niantic River
Pattagansett River
Fourmile River
Threemile River
Black Hall River

Connecticut River
Back River
Lieutenant River
Falls River
Eightmile River
Deep River
Salmon River
Moodus River
Blackledge River
Jeremy River
Sumner Brook
Pameacha Creek
Mattabesset River
Coginchaug River
Hockanum River
Tankerhoosen River
Park River – also known as Hog River and Little River
North Branch Park River
South Branch Park River
Podunk River
Farmington River
Pequabu River
Pequabuck River
Nepaug River
Poland River 
East Branch Farmington River
Hubbard River
West Branch Farmington River
Still River
Mad River
Scantic River
Watchaug River
Patchogue River
Menunketesuck River
Indian River (Clinton)
Hammonasset River
Neck River
East River
West River (Guilford)
Branford River
Farm River

Quinnipiac River
Muddy River
Tenmile River
 Mountain Brook
Eightmile River
Mill River
West River
Sargent River
Cove River
Oyster River
Indian River (Milford)
Wepawaug River

Housatonic River
Farmill River
Naugatuck River
Mad River
Halfway River
Pomperaug River
Nonnewaug River
Weekeepeemee River
Pootatuck River
Shepaug River
Bantam River
Marshepaug River
Still River
West Aspetuck River
East Aspetuck River
Rocky River
Ten Mile River
Hollenbeck River
Blackberry River
Whiting River
Konkapot River
Pequonnock River
Ash Creek
Rooster River
Mill River
Saugatuck River
West Branch Saugatuck River
Aspetuck River
Little River
Norwalk River
Silvermine River

Fivemile River
Noroton River
Rippowam River – also known as Mill River in its lower end in Stamford
Mianus River
Byram River – Westernmost river basin in Connecticut

New York Harbor 

Hudson River (New York)
Croton River (New York)
Titicus River

References

See also
List of rivers in the United States

Connecticut rivers
 
Rivers